Alzira Handforth Peirce Albaugh (née Boehm; January 31, 1908 – June 19, 2010) was an American artist.

Early life
She and her siblings moved to Circle, Montana, to live as homesteaders after their father, August Abraham Boehm, died. Their mother, Hazel Hunter Handforth (born September 12, 1883, Huntsville, Missouri - died circa 1957, Central Islip, New York) was a suffragette, a homesteader, and later, a restaurateur in New York's Greenwich Village in the 1920s.

Her father, August Abraham Boehm (born 1880, Vienna, Austria-Hungary – died 1916), was an Austrian-born New York City real estate developer of Jewish descent. August Boehm had graduated from Columbia University in 1901 but was affected by the panic of 1907 in which his own father, Abraham Boehm (1841, Germany - 1912, New York), a German-born Jewish New York City real estate developer, lost most of his fortune. Boehm & Coon (est. 1882) had commissioned one of New York's first skyscrapers, the 11-story Diamond Exchange Building (1893–94), as well as The Langham, a prestigious Manhattan apartment building. The elder Boehm partnered with Sir Hiram Stevens Maxim in introducing gas engines to Europe.
 
Growing up in McCone County, Montana, Alzira played the harmonica, drew, and rode horses. When she was 13 she returned to New York and sought employment through one of her paternal uncles, an architect. In New York she studied at the Art Students League and later traveled to Paris to study. She painted, sculpted, and drew many works of art. Her poetry was published in The New Yorker.

Career

She taught art to sailors on leave at the International Seamen's Union. One of her students was the cartoonist Gahan Wilson. Her art exhibitions were cited in "Who was Who in American Art" page 477 Biographies of American Artists Active from 1898-1947, by Sound View Press 1985.

She worked for the Red Cross during World War II for nearly two years. She was captain of the American Red Cross Motor Corps and was the chief of motor corps training of the Rockland County Civilian Protection Group. She worked organizing units of the driving Corps, training them, and supervising their operations.

She rose from officer to captain and conducted the training unit for O.C.D. Drivers training. She was assigned to a district of the park system which included a section of the Palisades Interstate Park Police, Fourth Precinct, Second District Rockland Lake, New York, June 7, 1942. Alzira Peirce was also cited by the municipality of Haverstraw, Rockland County, New York on September 26, 1942 for her work with the motor corps.

After leaving the Army, Waldo and Alzira Peirce divorced. Waldo was 24 years her senior; she had become Peirce's third wife in 1930; the couple had three children, Mellen Chamberlain "Bill" Peirce, Michael Peirce, and Anna Peirce. Anna predeceased her mother. Mellen Chamberlain Peirce is an active poet and playwright who lives in London. His wife is Gareth Peirce, the human rights activist attorney for the Birmingham Six and Gerry Conlon and the Guildford Four. Emma Thompson was nominated for an Oscar playing Gareth in the 1993 movie In The Name of the Father, with Daniel Day-Lewis also nominated for his role as Conlon.

Alzira married again to Chuck Albaugh having her fourth child, Kathleen Swoboda.

She was commissioned by the Treasury Section of Fine Art, a New Deal agency, to paint two murals. In 1938 she completed Ellsworth, Lumber Port in Ellsworth, Maine and in 1939 Shipwreck at Night in South Portland, Maine.

An avid artist, she created many sculptures, paintings, and drawings. She moved to New Mexico and worked as an organizer for the United Mine Workers union.

Death
Alzira Peirce Albaugh died in 2010, aged 102, from sepsis in Brighton, Massachusetts. She was survived by her two sons, her younger daughter; Kathleen, and nine grandchildren.

Affiliations
 Union member of the typesetters union
 National Society of Mural Painters
 Federation of Modern Painters and Sculptors

References

1908 births
2010 deaths
Artists from Montana
Painters from New York City
American centenarians
American women painters
American women trade unionists
American people of German-Jewish descent
Deaths from sepsis
People from McCone County, Montana
20th-century American painters
20th-century American women artists
Women centenarians
Trade unionists from Montana
Trade unionists from New York (state)
21st-century American women